WWDE-FM (101.3 MHz) is a commercial radio station licensed to Hampton, Virginia, serving the Norfolk/Hampton Roads media market.  WWDE-FM airs an adult contemporary radio format, with a country format formerly on their HD2 subchannel.  The station is owned and operated by Audacy, Inc.

WWDE-FM has studios and offices on Clearfield Avenue in Virginia Beach.  The transmitter is off East Indian River Road in Norfolk.

WWDE-FM broadcasts in HD.  The station calls itself "2WD" referring to the two Ws in its call letters, followed by a D and an E that can be pronounced as "DEE."  WWDE-FM is one of two Hampton Roads FM radio stations to play all-Christmas music from mid-November to December 25, the other being WMOV-FM, owned by iHeartMedia.

History

The station first signed on the air on June 1, 1962 Owned by Dick Lamb, Larry Saunders and Gene Loving.  During the 1970s, it was co-owned with WVEC (1490 AM, now WXTG) and WVEC-TV.  Its call letters were WVHR, and it aired a middle of the road music format, sometimes simulcast with its AM sister station. Its longtime adult contemporary format started on July 31, 1978, with Lamb and sidekick Paul Richardson hosting the "2WD Breakfast Bunch" until January 28, 2005. Both have moved to rival WTWV-FM.

On December 26, 2006, WWDE shifted to Soft Adult Contemporary, but retained the "2WD" moniker. On April 1, 2013, WWDE shifted back to Mainstream Adult Contemporary, and rebranded as "The New 101.3 2WD".

In May 1987, a popular WWDE overnight DJ, Debbie Dicus, was murdered in broad daylight while tending to her garden in a public park in Hampton. Her tragic murder is noted on a Forensic Files episode, "Garden of Evil."

References

Hampton Roads Media Information
Article about Dick Lamb in the Virginian Pilot

External links

WDE-FM
Radio stations established in 1962
Mainstream adult contemporary radio stations in the United States
Audacy, Inc. radio stations